USCGC Spencer (WMEC-905) is a United States Coast Guard medium endurance cutter. Her keel was laid on 26 June 1982 at Robert Derecktor Shipyard Incorporated, Middletown, Rhode Island. She was named for John Canfield Spencer, United States Secretary of the Treasury from 1843 to 1844 under President John Tyler and launched on 17 April 1984 and was commissioned into service on 28 June 1986. In March 1991, Spencer towed a disabled U.S. Navy frigate, a ship twice Spencer's size, to safety. Spencer participated in the search for a missing Air National Guard pararescueman during the 1991 Perfect Storm. In 1999, Spencer was the on-scene command vessel for the EgyptAir Flight 990 crash off Nantucket, controlling both U.S. Navy and Coast Guard assets in the search and recovery efforts.

Operational history
During a law enforcement patrol in 1987, Spencer arrested 23 people and confiscated more than 46,000 pounds of marijuana from four smuggling vessels. While on a south patrol in 1989, Spencer rescued and repatriated 538 Haitian migrants bound for the United States, and later seized a Panamanian freighter laden with 438 kilograms of cocaine. In June 1994, Spencer made the first planned deployment of a 270-foot cutter with an SH-60 helicopter. This ship/helicopter deployment was shortened so that Spencer could participate in the response to a mass exodus of Haitian migrants. Spencer was on-scene command for patrol boats conducting survivor/decedent recovery of the Feb. 1993 ferry sinking in the Gulf of Gonave. The ship rescued over 1700 Haitian migrants during this patrol, 544 of whom were rescued on a single day on July 4, 1994. Two months later, Spencer repatriated more than 200 Haitian migrants from Guantanamo Bay, Cuba to Port-au-Prince, Haiti.  During New York City's Annual Fleet Week of 1995, Spencer opened her brow to more than 5000 visitors. Spencer also carried several crew members from the World War II cutter of the same name in honor of Fleet Week's celebration of the fiftieth anniversary of the end of that war. In early 1996, Spencer responded to the downed Alas Nacionales plane crash off the coastal waters of the Dominican Republic in which 188 people lost their lives. On April 22, 1997, Spencer seized 3905 pounds of cocaine off the coast of Honduras. When the fishing vessel Lady of Grace became disabled during a severe storm in November 1997, Spencer was there to save the crew and tow the vessel to safety. Recently, Spencer worked with the French warship Ventôse, to seize 1800 kilograms of pure cocaine off the coast of Venezuela.

External links

Spencer home page

Ships of the United States Coast Guard
Famous-class cutters
1984 ships
Ships built in Middletown, Rhode Island